David Joseph Sheppard (December 12, 1931 in New York City – November 5, 2000) was an American weightlifter and Olympic medalist.

He received a silver medal at the 1956 Summer Olympics in Melbourne.

Weightlifting achievements
Silver medalist in Olympic Games (1956).
Silver medalist in Senior World Championship (1951, 1953, 1954, and 1958).
Pan Am Games champion (1955).
Senior national champion (1954, 1955, and 1958).
Set five world records during career.

References

External links

1931 births
2000 deaths
Sportspeople from New York City
American male weightlifters
Weightlifters at the 1956 Summer Olympics
Olympic silver medalists for the United States in weightlifting
Medalists at the 1956 Summer Olympics
Pan American Games medalists in weightlifting
Pan American Games gold medalists for the United States
Weightlifters at the 1955 Pan American Games
20th-century American people
21st-century American people